Peter Joseph John McLeavey  (21 September 1936 – 12 November 2015) was a New Zealand art dealer and advocate based in Wellington.

Early life
Born in Raetihi on 21 September 1936, McLeavey was the son of Leslie Francis McLeavey and Elizabeth Theresa McLeavey (née McTiernan). His father worked on the railways and his childhood was spent moving around railway settlements in New Zealand's North Island, including Ohakune, Levin, Napier, Feilding, New Plymouth, Waitara, and Lower Hutt. He credited the beginning of his interest in art to a teacher at his high school in Waitara.

Career

Jeremy Diggle, Professor of Fine Arts at Massey University, called McLeavey "the most important commercial gallerist New Zealand has ever had, effectively the pre-eminent publisher of modern New Zealand art in the past 50 years". His eponymous gallery is the longest-lived in New Zealand.

McLeavey started his art dealing career in 1966, showing art in the bedroom of his apartment on central Wellington street The Terrace. His first sale was a Toss Woollaston landscape. In a 2009 documentary about his life, The Man in the Hat, McLeavey stated that he set up the gallery to "feed the culture, and to expose the culture to people who didn't know about it".

In 1968 he opened a gallery in two rooms on the first floor of 147 Cuba Street in Wellington. Alongside other early emerging dealer galleries, such as Barry Lett Galleries in Auckland, Peter McLeavey Gallery played an important role in encouraging collectors to support contemporary New Zealand artists. Among his major sales were Colin McCahon's Northland Panels to the then National Art Gallery (now the Museum of New Zealand Te Papa Tongarewa) in 1978. This is now seen as one of McCahon's most important works. 

The gallery continues to operate at that location, and more than 500 exhibitions have been mounted there. McLeavey's daughter, Olivia McLeavey, took over the running of the gallery in 2011, when his health declined.

The Peter McLeavey Gallery currently represents some of New Zealand's best-known modern and contemporary artists, including Laurence Aberhart, Bill Hammond, Richard Killeen, Colin McCahon, Yvonne Todd, Robin White, Toss Woollaston, and Jeffrey Harris.

McLeavey died in Wellington on 12 November 2015 at the age of 79.

In September 2018 his archive was acquired by the Alexander Turnbull Library. It will be available by request in late 2019 or 2020.

The Man in the Hat
In 2009, a documentary about McLeavey was released, directed by Luit Bieringa, produced by Jan Bieringa, and filmed by cinematographer Leon Narbey. The documentary intersperses scenes of McLeavey going about life at home, in inner-city Wellington, and in his gallery with readings by New Zealand actor Sam Neill from McLeavey's correspondence with artists.

Peter McLeavey: The life and times of a New Zealand art dealer
In 2013 a biography of McLeavey by Jill Trevelyan was published by Te Papa Press. The biography, Peter McLeavey: The life and times of a New Zealand art dealer was named the 2014 New Zealand Post Book Awards Book of the Year.

Honours 
Massey University awarded McLeavey an Honorary Doctor of Fine Arts (DFA) in 2010 and he was appointed an Officer of the New Zealand Order of Merit for services to the arts in the 2012 Queen's Birthday and Diamond Jubilee Honours.

References

Further reading 
 Trevelyan, Jill. (2013). Peter McLeavey: The life and times of a New Zealand art dealer. Te Papa Press. . 
 The Man in the Hat (2009). Documentary about McLeavey
Interview with Luit Bieringa and Peter McLeavey. Radio New Zealand, 24 June 2013.
Oral history interview
Jill Trevelyan, I run towards the Sun. I touch the face of God, photo essay published on the Museum of New Zealand Te Papa Tongarewa website, December 2015 

1936 births
2015 deaths
New Zealand art collectors
People from Raetihi
Deaths from Parkinson's disease
Neurological disease deaths in New Zealand
New Zealand art dealers
Officers of the New Zealand Order of Merit